The Fifth Woman (original: Den femte kvinnan; 1996) is a crime novel by Swedish author Henning Mankell, the sixth in his acclaimed Inspector Wallander series.

Synopsis
A sadistic serial killer has been preying on men, beginning with a retired car salesman whose interests appear to be limited to bird watching and poetry and whose body was discovered in a punji stick pit; and continuing with a flower shop manager, found starved and garrotted in the woods. Wallander soon realises both men have a past record of violence towards women, and after another man is drowned in a lake, he goes on the hunt for an avenging angel...

Adaptations
In 2002, The Fifth Woman was adapted by Swedish public broadcaster Sveriges Television into a four-part television miniseries, starring Rolf Lassgård as Wallander. British broadcaster BBC commissioned a 90-minute adaptation for its Wallander television series starring Kenneth Branagh. The episode was broadcast in January 2010.

1996 Swedish novels
Novels by Henning Mankell
Wallander
Novels set in Sweden
Ordfront books